Oenus was a legendary king of the Britons as accounted by Geoffrey of Monmouth.  He was preceded by Cap and succeeded by Sisillius III.

References

Legendary British kings